Below are different types of weapons used in World War II by the United States.

Blades
M1 bayonet
M1917 bayonet
M4 bayonet
Ka-bar
Bolo knife
Bowie knife
United States Marine Raider stiletto
V-42

Small arms

Pistols (manual and semi-automatic)

Automatic pistols and submachine guns

Rifles

Carbines

Shotguns

Winchester M12 
Browning Auto-5
Remington 31
Stevens M520-30
Ithaca 37
Winchester Model 1897

Grenades and grenade launchers
M7 grenade launcher
Mk 2 grenade

Mines
M2 mine
M5 mine
M7 mine

Recoilless rifles
M18 recoilless rifle
M20 recoilless rifle

Flamethrowers
M1A1 flamethrower
M2-A1 flamethrower
Ronson flamethrower

Machine guns

Infantry and dual
Browning M1917A1 (.30-'06)
Browning M1918A2 (.30-'06)
Browning M1919A4/A6 and family (.30-'06)
M1941 Johnson Light Machine Gun (LMG) (.30-'06)
Browning M2HB (.50 BMG)

Vehicle and aircraft machine guns and autocannons
20mm autocannon
37mm autocannon
40mm Bofors autocannon
M4 cannon 
M2 cannon
50 caliber machine gun (Browning M2)
M1919A4 Browning machine gun
M1917 HMG AA configuration

Tanks

Light Tank 
M2 Light tank
M3 Stuart
M5 Stuart
M22 Locust
M24 Chaffee
LVT-1 alligator (and variants)

Medium Tanks 

M2 Medium Tank
M3 Lee
M4 Sherman (and variants)

Heavy Tanks 

 M26 Pershing
 M26 Super Pershing
 M6 (Prototype)
T29 (Prototype)
T30 (Prototype)
T32 (Prototype)

Tank Destroyers 

M10 Wolverine
M18 Hellcat
M36 Jackson

Flame Tanks 

 M5 Satan
 Sherman Zippo

Other vehicles

Passenger vehicles
Dodge WC series
Willys MB

Motorcycles
Harley-Davidson WLA

Amphibious vehicles
 Landing Vehicle Tracked
 M29 Weasel
 DUKW

Trucks
 GMC CCKW 2½-ton 6×6 truck
 Studebaker US6
 M35 series 2½-ton 6×6 cargo truck

Artillery

Infantry mortars
M1 Mortar
M2 4.2 inch mortar
M2 Mortar

Heavy mortars & rocket launchers
T34 Calliope
T40 Whizbang

Self propelled guns
Howitzer Motor Carriage M8
M40 Gun Motor Carriage
M7 Priest

Field artillery

75 mm Gun M1917 - copy of British gun re-chambered for French cartridge, produced for export
QF 2.95-inch Mountain Gun  - imported from Britain, used in Philippines
75 mm Gun M2/M3/M6
 M116 howitzer (75 mm) -also known as "75mm Pack Howitzer M1"
76 mm gun M1
 M101 howitzer (105mm) - still used in US and worldwide as late as in 2014
 M3 howitzer (105mm)
 Canon de 155mm GPF
 M114 155 mm howitzer - also known as M1 155 mm Howitzer
 M2 155 mm Field Gun (Long Tom)
4.5-inch Gun M1 - version to fire British ammunition
 M115 203 mm howitzer
 8-inch Gun M1
 M1 240 mm Howitzer

Fortress and siege guns
5"/51 caliber gun (coastal defense)
8-inch M1888 (obsolete)
8-inch Mk. VI railway gun
M1918 240 mm howitzer (obsolete)
8-inch Mk. VI railway gun
12-inch coast defense mortar (also railway version)
12-inch Gun M1895
14-inch M1920 railway gun
16"/50 caliber M1919 gun

Anti-tank guns
National Forge & Ordnance 37mm gun (1941) - export (to Dutch) only
 M3 37 mm Anti-Tank Gun
 M1 57 mm Anti-Tank Gun
 M5 3-Inch Anti-Tank Gun
105mm gun T8 AT/AA gun (cancelled)

Anti-tank weapons (besides anti-tank guns)
Rocket Launcher M1/M1A1/M9 (Bazooka)
Boys anti-tank rifle
M18 Recoilless Rifle
M20 recoilless rifle
M22 dodge rifle

See also 
List of U.S. Army weapons by supply catalog designation
List of individual weapons of the U.S. Armed Forces
List of crew-served weapons of the U.S. Armed Forces
List of vehicles of the U.S. Armed Forces
List of World War II weapons

Weapons